Mild may refer to:

Mild ale, often simply referred to as mild
Håkan Mild (born 1971), Swedish former footballer and current director of sports of IFK Göteborg
Hans Mild (1934–2007), Swedish football, ice hockey, and bandy player
An acronym for Mnemonic induction of lucid dreams, a technique developed by Stephen LaBerge to facilitate the occurrence of lucid dreaming

See also
List of people known as the Mild